Vertical formation skydiving (VFS) is a subcategory of formation skydiving using high-speed body positions normally associated with freeflying. Competitors build pre-selected formations in free-fall with multiple people gripping each other's limbs or specially built "grippers" on their jumpsuits.

The Fédération Aéronautique Internationale (FAI) world record for the largest VFS free-fall formation is a 164-way, set on July 31, 2015 over Chicago, Illinois, United States.  

Project Horizon, the Lodi Sequentials, VFS Arizona and several other yearly invitational skydiving events are centered on pushing the boundaries of VFS.

Competition 

There is only one category of official VFS competition, that being VFS 4-way, which is part of the United States Parachute Association Skydiving Nationals.  The first official VFS 4-Way US Nationals Competition was held on October 27, 2006, in Eloy, Arizona.  Nine teams (45 skydivers) competed.

VFS 4-way has been adopted as an addition to future FAI world competitions (as VFS 4-way), the first being the FAI World Cup in Eloy, AZ, in October 2008.

External links

USPA The United States Parachute Association – The governing body for sport skydiving in the U.S.
Competition History USPA History of Skydiving Competition
FAI The Federation Aeronautique Internationale – The international governing body for all airborne sports, including skydiving.

Parachuting